Osman Nejat Konuk (1928 – 31 December 2014) was a 2nd prime minister of Northern Cyprus, He held this office twice, once from 1976 to 1978 and a second time from 1983 to 1985.

Early life, career and death
Born in 1928 in Nicosia, Cyprus, Osman Nejat Konuk completed his primary and secondary education in Nicosia. In 1951, he graduated with a degree in Law from the Ankara Faculty of Law, Turkey.

Following his graduation he worked in Turkey in the public sector as legal advisor (Bursa Forestry Department. He left public service in 1955 and worked as an independent lawyer until 1960. In 1960 he returned to Cyprus and assumed the role of General Secretary at the newly formed Turkish Community Parliament in Cyprus (Türk Cemaat Meclisi), followed by a role as the Undersecretary to the Turkish Cypriot Leader.

With the establishment of the transitional Autonomous Turkish Cypriot Administration when Rauf Denktaş became Vice-Turkish Cypriot Leader, he was appointed as Denktaş's Undersecretary. In 1969, Konuk portfolio was changed when he was appointed to be the Undersecretary of Justice and Interior.
 
At the 5 July 1970 general elections, he was elected to the Turkish Cypriot Community Parliament, representing Nicosia district. In the new Executive Board (government) of the Turkish Cypriot Community he was tasked with the Justice and Interior Affairs portfolio.

On 24 February 1975 on the first plenary meeting of the Parliament of the Turkish Federated State of Cyprus (KTFD) he became a member of the government and then elected as the General Secretary of his party, National Unity Party. At the 1976 general elections he was re-elected to the parliament from Nicosia. With NUP majority Konuk was appointed to form the first government of the newly formed KTFD and served as Prime Minister until he resigned from both the post and from his party in 1978.

He served as the speaker of the legislature from 1981 to 1983.

He joined the Democratic Peoples' Party (DHP) and became its leader.
He was re-elected to the parliament as a DHP MP for Nicosia.  In the 1983 constituent assembly of the newly formed Turkish Republic of Northern Cyprus he served as Nicosia MP and was appointed to the Premiership of the new republic serving between 1983 and 1985. In 1985 Konuk retired from active politics.

He died of cancer in his home in Istanbul, Turkey at the night of 31 December 2014, aged 86.

References
TRNC government document on Nejat Konuk

1928 births
2014 deaths
20th-century prime ministers of Northern Cyprus
People from Nicosia
Prime Ministers of Northern Cyprus
Speakers of the Assembly of Northern Cyprus
Turkish Cypriot expatriates in Turkey
20th-century Cypriot lawyers
Ankara University alumni